The G! Festival (commonly known as G!, in Faroese also called G! Festivalur or G! Festivalurin) is a Faroese musical festival, held annually at the seaside village Gøta on Eysturoy in mid or late July, but always before the Ólavsøka. It is one of the two largest music festivals on the Faroe Islands, the other being Summarfestivalurin. It was founded by Sólarn Solmunde and musician Jón Tyril, both locals. Jón is also the present chairman of the festival. The G! Festival is an innovative cultural event which has been well received. The festival brings together leading international musicians as well as local musicians. The founding goal was to change the musical landscape of the Faroes. Working to achieve this goal has earned the festival the position as the most important and influential musical event on the islands.

History
The G! Festival was the first real outdoor music festival ever held on the Faroe Islands. Around 1000 people bought tickets to the first festival in 2002, and ticket sales have grown steadily ever since. In 2005 the G! Festival arrangers announced the festival sold out, with ticket sales of 6000. An estimated 2000 to 4000 people partook in the music festival from outside the festival area, mainly in boats on the sea or in the hills and roads surrounding the area. It is believed that a fifth of the entire population of the Faroe Islands partook in the 2005 festival.

In 2005 Jón Tyril received the M.A. Jacobsen Distinguished Prize for Cultural Achievement for his work with G! Festival.

G! Festival cooperates annually with Iceland Airwaves. Each year, a group from the G! roster will perform at Airwaves and vice versa.

Specific years

2003
The 2003 festival featured artists such as Bomfunk MC’s (FI), Úlpa   (IS), Xploding Plastix (NO), Glorybox (DK), Clickhaze (FO).

2004
The 2004 festival featured artists such as Kashmir (DK), Lisa Ekdahl (SE), Russ Taff (US)
, Temple of Sound (UK), Darude (FI), Gåte (NO).

2005
The 2005 festival featured artists such as Nephew (DK), Blue Foundation (DK), Beats and Styles (FI), Glenn Kaiser (US), Hjálmar (IS), Afenginn (DK), Europe (SE), Eivør Pálsdóttir (FO), Teitur (FO).

2006
The 2006 festival featured artists such as Mugison (IS), Animal Alpha (NO), Beth Hart (US), Kaizers Orchestra (NO), Outlandish (DK), Infernal (DK), Eivør Pálsdóttir (FO), Teitur (FO).

2007
The 2007 festival featured artists such as Natasha Bedingfield (UK), Guillemots (UK), Young Dubliners (US), The Dixie Hummingbirds (US), Nephew (DK), Hatesphere (DK), Serena Maneesh (NO), Adjágas (NO), Polkaholix (DE), Pétur Ben (IS), Dr. Spock (IS), Eivør Pálsdóttir (FO), Teitur Lassen (FO), Lena Anderssen (FO), Boys In A Band (FO), Sic (FO) Metronomy (UK)

2009
The 2009 festival featured artists such as Spleen United (DK), Mr Flash (FR), Familjen (SE), Katzenjammer (NO), Nathan James (US), Veto (DK), The Haunted (SE), Valravn (FO/DK), Boys In A Band (FO), Annika Hoydal (FO), Teitur Lassen (FO), Heiðrik á Heygum (FO), Bet Your Are William (FO), Lena Anderssen (FO), Dánjal á Neystabø (FO), Frændur (FO), Tinganest (FO).

2010
The 2010 festival featured artists such as Arch Enemy (SE), Moto Boy (SE), FM Belfast (IS), Eivør Pálsdóttir (FO), Nephew (DK), Lucy Love (DK), Týr (FO) and The Ghost (FO).

2011
The 2011 festival featured artists such as Travis (UK), The Tennessee Mafia Jug Band (US),  Annemarie Zimakoff (DK), Mugison (IS), Petur Pólson (FO), Orka (FO), Andy Irvine (IRE), Guðrið Hansdóttir (FO), Fallulah (DK), Skálmöld (IS), Hamferð (FO), Guðrun & Bartal (FO), Blind Boys of Alabama (US), Movits! (SE), Meshuggah (SE), Týr (FO), Sic (band)(FO), Nive Nielsen and the Deer Children (GR) and more.

2012
The 2012 festival featured artists such as Kapten Röd (SE), Raske Penge (DK), Retro Stefson (IS), Hogni (FO), Eivør Pálsdóttir (FO), Amsterdam Klezmer Band (NL) 200 (FO), Teitur Lassen (FO), Rosa Lux (DK), Nanook (GL) Hamferð (FO) Guðrið Hansdóttir (FO), JPFT Soundsystem (DK), Benjamin (FO), Brynjolfur (FO), Gipsy Train (FO), Villu Veski (EE), Momentum (IS), SAKARIS (FO), Marius Ziska (FO), Frændur (FO), Knút (FO), Kaj Klein (FO), KGB (IS), Lív Næs (FO), Kiasmos (FO/IS)  and more.

2013
The 2013 G!festival featured artists such as Nephew (DK), Karin Park (SE), Ásgeir Trausti (IS), Reptile Youth (DK), Alina Devecerski (SE), Laid Back (DK), Den Sorte Skole (DK), Eivør Pálsdóttir (FO), Hamferð (FO), Byrta (FO), 200 (FO), Teitur Lassen (FO), Marius Ziska (FO), Benjamin (FO), Angist (IS), Earth Divide (FO), Hogni (FO), Boys In A Band (FO), Kári Sverrisson w/ Bendar Spónir (FO), Yggdrasil (FO), Brynjolfur (FO), LV & Okmalumkoolkat (US/SA), MRC Riddims (US), Fredo (UK), Himmerland (DK), Sun Glitters (LX), Lula Rose (DE), Afenginn (DK) and more.

2014
The 2014 G!festival featured artists including Sister Sledge (US), Moddi (NO), Týr (FO), Kaleo (IS), Lydmor (DK) and more.

2015
The 2015 G!festival featured artists including Dizzy Mizz Lizzy (DK), Hackney Colliery Band (UK), At the Gates (SE), Jamie Woon (UK) and more.

2016
The 2016 G!festival featured artists including Steve'n'Seagulls (FI), SBCR AKA The Bloody Beetroots DJ SET (IT), Dub Phizix & Strategy (UK), Songhoy Blues (ML), Lucy Rose (UK), Hudson Taylor (IE) and Gabrielle Aplin (UK), Hot 8 Brass Band (US), Phlake (DK), Federspiel (AT), Annika Hoydal (FO) and more.

2017
The 2017 G!festival featured artists including MØ (DK), Kristoffer Kristofferson (US), Bilderbuch (AT), Suspekt (DK), Alphaville (DE), Bombino (NE), Monophonics (US), Fil Bo Riva (IT), Baskery (SE), Reykjavíkurdætur (IS), Brothers Moving (DK), Desert Mountain Tribe (UK), Teitur (FO), Konni Kass (FO), 200 (FO), Orka (FO) Elinborg (FO), Son of Fortune (FO), Frederik Elsner (GL) and more.

2018
The 2018 G!festival featured artists including Rag n' Bone Man (UK), Ben Gibbard (US), Harlem Gospel Choir (US), Faithless DJ SET (UK), Scarlet Pleasure (DK), Ba Cissoko (GN), Brothers Moving (DK), Eivør (FO), Teitur (FO), Hamferð (FO), Úlfur Úlfur (IS), Marius Ziska (FO), Son of Fortune (FO), Nelson Can (DK), Hogni (FO), and more.

References

External links
 G! Festival website
 Playlouder.com G! Festival 2006

Music festivals in the Faroe Islands
Faroese music
Music festivals established in 2002
2002 establishments in the Faroe Islands
Rock festivals in the Faroe Islands
Summer events in the Faroe Islands